The Highline Ballroom was a music venue and nightclub located at 431 West 16th Street in Manhattan in New York City.

Description
Primarily featuring musical acts, its capacity was approximately 700 people  hosting diverse concert programming from "rock to hip hop" year round.

The venue was owned by Steve Bensusan.

The last show was performed by The Roots on February 4, 2019.

See also

 List of jazz clubs

References

External links

Year of establishment missing
Drinking establishments in Manhattan
Jazz clubs in New York City
Music venues in Manhattan
Nightclubs in Manhattan
Ballrooms in Manhattan